Bleed for Me may refer to:

 "Bleed for Me" (Black Label Society song)
 "Bleed for Me" (Dead Kennedys song)
 "Bleed for Me" (Lahannya song)